Maud von Rosen (born 24 December 1925) is a Swedish equestrian and Olympic medalist. She won a bronze medal in dressage at the 1972 Summer Olympics in Munich.

References

External links

1925 births
Living people
Swedish female equestrians
Swedish dressage riders
Olympic equestrians of Sweden
Olympic bronze medalists for Sweden
Equestrians at the 1972 Summer Olympics
Olympic medalists in equestrian
Medalists at the 1972 Summer Olympics